Aqazadeh (also Romanized as Āqāzādeh) is a village in Safiabad Rural District, Bam and Safiabad District, Esfarayen County, North Khorasan Province, Iran. At the 2006 census, its population was 472, in 102 families.

References 

Populated places in Esfarayen County